Abdulla Muaz is a Maldivian film actor, editor and directors and officers and

Career
Muaz made a brief appearance in Yoosuf Shafeeu directed horror film Edhathuru (2004) which revolves around eight friends who go on a picnic to a haunted uninhabited island and their battle for survival. The film garnered critical appreciation specially for its sound effect and was a commercial success.

Moomin Fuad and Ali Shifau's critically appreciated crime film Heylaa (2006) featured Muaz as a drug user. The film narrates the story of a fourteen years old ambitious boy who finds himself unknowingly being involved in smuggling of a revolver. It was the first Maldivian film to be shot in high-definition digital video. Though the film received positive reviews from critics, it was a commercial failure. Co-director of the film Shifau opined that its commercial status was a result of casting "not very prominent" faces in the film and the "film-goers were not ready to accept the genre" at the time of release. Ahmed Nadheem from Haveeru praised the narration and plot of the film while calling his performance to be "strictly average". He next appeared as a man practicing the art of palmistry in Hukuru Vileyrey (2006), co-directed by Aishath Rishmy and Aminath Rasheedha which was based on a novel published by Ibrahim Waheed on Haveeru Daily in 2003. The film was a critical and commercial success while being considered as "one of the few acceptable horror film the Maldivian Film Industry has ever produced". It was later released as 15 episodes television series with inclusion of several clips that were edited off while released in theatre.

Muaz officially made his film debut in a leading role with Yoosuf Shafeeu-directed Hiyy Rohvaanulaa (2009) which features Shafeeu, Niuma Mohamed and Nadhiya Hassan alongside him. The film follows a blind man who regains his eyesight but decides to fake his blindness to discover her wife's affair with another man. Muaz played the role of Vishal, a ruthless and determined man who is ready to go extreme extent to win back his first love. The film received favorable reviews from critics and was a commercial success.

The following year he starred in Niuma Mohamed's directorial debut drama film Niuma (2010) alongside an ensemble cast including Mohamed, Yoosuf Shafeeu, Sheela Najeeb, Mohamed Manik, Aminath Rasheedha and Ahmed Nimal. He played the tolerant boyfriend who was unaware tat his girlfriend being sexually abused by her father and brother. Upon release, the film met with widespread critical acclaim specifically complimenting the performance of actors and its dialogues. Being able to screen over thirty housefull shows of the film, it was declared a Mega-Hit at box office, and the highest grossing Maldivian release of the year. The film fetched him a Gaumee Film Award for Best Supporting Actor and a nomination for Best Editing at 6th Gaumee Film Awards while winning in the same category at 1st Maldives Film Awards.

In 2013, Muaz starred opposite Ismail Rasheed in Ravee Farooq directed critically acclaimed experimental suspense thriller Ingili. It was based on fourteen years old Mohamed Hassaan's National Award-winning short story, Holhuasheege Ekuveriya. It celebrates the first Maldivian film to get recognized internationally by winning bronze medal in Best Feature Film category at SAARC Film Festival 2014 held in Colombo, Sri Lanka. He received another Gaumee Film Award nomination for Best Supporting Actor while winning a Maldives Film Award for Best Supporting Actor for his performance in the film.

In 2016, he featured alongside Niuma Mohamed, Yoosuf Shafeeu in Ibrahim Wisan's debut direction Vee Beyvafa which was shot in 2011. The film received a negative response from critics while Ahmed Adhushan of Mihaaru concluded his review calling the film "a step backward" in the progress of cinema.

Media image
In 2018, he was ranked in the eighth position from Dho?'s list of Top Ten Actor of Maldives.

Filmography

Feature film

Television

Short film

Other work

Discography

Accolades

References 

Living people
People from Malé
21st-century Maldivian male actors
Maldivian male film actors
Maldivian film directors
Year of birth missing (living people)